"What?!" is the fourth episode of the second season of the American dark comedy crime television series Barry. It is the 12th overall episode of the series and was written by co-producer Duffy Boudreau, and directed by Liza Johnson. It was first broadcast on HBO in the United States on April 21, 2019.

The series follows Barry Berkman, a hitman from Cleveland who travels to Los Angeles to kill someone but finds himself joining an acting class taught by Gene Cousineau, where he meets aspiring actress Sally Reed and begins to question his path in life as he deals with his criminal associates such as Monroe Fuches and NoHo Hank. In the episode, Barry decides to take matters on his own hands when Sally's abusive ex-husband reappears in her life, while Sally has to confront herself on never standing up to her ex-husband. Meanwhile, Fuches is pressured by Loach to get a confession from Barry, but he works in order to evade Barry confessing.

According to Nielsen Media Research, the episode was seen by an estimated 1.94 million household viewers and gained a 0.8 ratings share among adults aged 18–49. The episode received critical acclaim, with critics praising the performances (particularly Hader, Goldberg and Winkler), writing and ending. For his performance in the episode, Henry Winkler received an Outstanding Supporting Actor in a Comedy Series nomination at the 71st Primetime Emmy Awards.

Plot
Barry (Bill Hader) and Sally (Sarah Goldberg) dine with Sally's ex-husband, Sam (Joe Massingill), who stopped on his way to San Diego and mistakes Barry's name for "Bobby". Sally calmly welcomes Sam, but Barry maintains inner anger towards him. Later, while training with Hank (Anthony Carrigan), he unleashes his anger towards an incompetent henchman.

At the acting class, Barry expresses his discomfort with Sally's welcoming treatment of Sam. She then breaks down in his arms, stating that her scene is a lie and she didn't stand up to him, instead leaving him in the dead of night while he was asleep. Sally is distraught about potentially telling the truth about her relationship with Sam onstage, and Barry assures her that it's sometimes okay to keep secrets. Meanwhile, Loach (John Pirruccello) installs a covert listening device in the hotel room belonging to Fuches (Stephen Root), telling him that he needs to bring Barry to that room for a confession. Fuches talks with Barry, convincing him to visit the hotel room.

While Barry watches Sally rehearse her scene, he notices Sam in the cabin booth and promptly leaves. He confronts Sam in the parking lot, who tells him that he wanted to hear Sally's version of the story, insulting them before driving away. Back in the class, Sally gets a call from Sam, inviting her to come to his hotel so he can give her a gift. Although hesitant, she agrees to visit him. Barry, meanwhile, decides to confront Sam himself by taking his gun. Sally arrives at Sam's hotel room, where he gives her a flyer from one of her previous performances. She decides to stay a little longer when he states he has some family problems.

However, Sam's kind demeanor changes when Sally states she will still do the performance, calling her out for lying and revealing that he saw her rehearsing. Sally leaves when he gets threatening, with Barry almost shooting her when she opens the door, although he manages to hide before being noticed. Barry is forced to leave, angry. He misses meeting with Fuches, with Loach expressing anger. Fuches secretly calls Barry, telling him to avoid contact with him. Needing support, Barry visits Gene (Henry Winkler), who wants him to follow his real story, promising to not look him differently. Barry then opens up about the experience at Korangal Valley: after Albert was shot, he saw a man hiding in his house and then immediately killed the man. However, he was reprimanded as the man didn't shoot Albert. For his actions, Barry was discharged from the Marines.

Gene is impacted by Barry's story, telling him to never tell the story to anyone. He comforts Barry, telling him of his failed relationship with his son Leo (Andrew Leeds) but that everyone is capable of changing for the better. When Barry asks if he is a bad person, Gene just refers to him as a "human" person. Fuches attempts to escape from his hotel room through the window, when Barry appears, climbing to the hotel room. Despite Fuches' attempts to prevent Barry from saying anything, Barry confesses to killing Moss. Loach then enters, blowing Fuches' cover. Loach then shows him the recording device and turns it off. He then offers a deal to Barry: if he kills his ex wife's lover, Ronny (Daniel Bernhardt), he will allow him to go. A shocked Barry just says "What?!"

Production

Development
In April 2019, the episode's title was revealed as "What?!" and it was announced that co-producer Duffy Boudreau had written the episode while Liza Johnson had directed it. This was Boudreau's second writing credit, and Johnson's first directing credit.

Writing
Sally's abusive past was discussed by Bill Hader, who talked with some relatives who were victims of domestic abuse. The writers talked with many women on the subject, with Hader saying "everyone had different experiences or different ideas, but the consensus was that this was pretty honest." 

As writing on the season started, Hader thought "it would be great if Loach at one point needed Barry to kill his ex-wife's boyfriend." The writers would then work on the plotline, stating that it was vital that the episode would need to be in the middle of the season, "Right in here we should find that out, so let's build to that."

It was important for the writers to address the scene where Barry confessed killing an innocent man to Gene. As the writers originally did not plan to add Gene's son until a few episodes later, the line "I have a son" was supposed to be used as a surprise element.

Reception

Viewers
The episode was watched by 1.94 million viewers, earning a 0.8 in the 18-49 rating demographics on the Nielson ratings scale. This means that 0.8 percent of all households with televisions watched the episode. This was a 8% increase from the previous episode, which was watched by 1.78 million viewers with a 0.7 in the 18-49 demographics.

Critical reviews
"What?!" received critical acclaim. Vikram Murthi of The A.V. Club gave the episode an "A-" and wrote, "Barry keeps receiving second chances from the universe, but they only take the form of moral traps. Train Hank's army and then he can walk away. Kill Ronnie Proxin and the Moss situation goes away. Live a lie only if it's convenient. Tell the truth, but not the whole truth. Over time, 'Starting... now!' has become less of a promise and more of a threat." 

Nick Harley of Den of Geek wrote, "It doesn't matter if the laughs are few and far between, Barry has made us care about these characters and their personal journeys and is finally starting to show Barry, Sally, and Gene grow and evolve. Obviously being blackmailed to kill will likely be a setback for Barry, but we'll feel the frustration of that situation more deeply now that we've seen him make serious strides to better himself." Carissa Pavlica of TV Fanatic gave the episode a 4.75 star rating out of 5 and wrote, "They say timing is everything. Whether Barry's timing is good or terrible during 'What?!' depends on how you look at it. Barry's journey is significantly changed when he meets Sally's Ex, Sam. But another sharp turn reveals itself that could throw a wrench in his plans again."

Accolades
Henry Winkler submitted this episode into consideration for his Outstanding Supporting Actor in a Comedy Series nomination at the 71st Primetime Emmy Awards.

References

External links
 "What?!" at HBO
 

Barry (TV series) episodes
2019 American television episodes